The rabbit–duck illusion is a famous ambiguous image in which a rabbit or a duck can be seen.

It was captioned, in older German spelling, "" ("Which animals are most like each other?"), with "" ("Rabbit and Duck") written underneath.

After being used by psychologist Joseph Jastrow, the image was made famous by Ludwig Wittgenstein, who included it in his Philosophical Investigations as a means of describing two different ways of seeing: "seeing that" versus "seeing as".

Correlations 
Whether one sees a rabbit or a duck, and how often, may correlate with sociological, biological and psychological factors. For example, Swiss, both young and old, tend to see a bunny during Easter, and a bird/duck in October. It may also indicate creativity. A standard test of creativity is to list as many novel uses as one can for an everyday object (e.g. a paper clip) in a limited time. Wiseman et al. found was that participants who easily could see the image as either a rabbit or duck came up with an average of about 5 novel uses for their everyday item, while those who could not flip between rabbit and duck at all came up with fewer than 2 novel uses.

Philosophical and political implications 
Several scholars suggest that the illusion resonates philosophically, and politically. Wittgenstein, as Le Penne explains, employs the rabbit-duck illusion to distinguish perception from interpretation. If you only see a rabbit, you would say "this is a rabbit," but once you become aware of the duality you would say "now I see it as a rabbit." You may also say "it's a rabbit-duck," which, for Wittgenstein, is a perceptual report.

Abulof develops the point to explain how the illusion crystallizes the interplay between freedom (choice) and facticity (forced reality). If you see just a duck, you may need to actively choose to work on seeing the rabbit too, and once you do, to then choose which you see at any given point. While submitting that  "once you see the duck you cannot unsee it," Abulof claims that "trying to unsee what we already did might be less about choosing one perspective over another but about negating one, so that we don’t have to choose."

In popular culture 
 In the How I Met Your Mother episode "Rabbit or Duck", the rabbit-duck illusion is used to debate whether Robin is attracted to her colleague Don, leading to an intense fight among the group, with Marshall supporting rabbits as an object of desire, and Ted, Robin, Lily and Ranjit supporting ducks. Marshall eventually concedes the point.

References

External links

 Rabbitduck, a sculpture by Paul St George

Optical illusions
1892 in art
Rabbits and hares in art
Birds in art